Hungary competed at the 1964 Winter Olympics in Innsbruck, Austria.

Alpine skiing

Women

Cross-country skiing

Women

Women's 3 x 5 km relay

Figure skating

Men

Women

Ice hockey

First round
Winners (in bold) qualified for the Group A to play for 1st-8th places. Teams, which lost their qualification matches, played in Group B for 9th-16th places.

|}

Consolation round 

Italy 6-4 Hungary
Austria 3-0 Hungary
Poland 6-2 Hungary
Norway 5-1 Hungary
Yugoslavia 4-2 Hungary
Japan 6-2 Hungary
Romania 8-3 Hungary

Competitors
Mátyás Vedres
György Losonczi
József Babán
József Kertész
Lajos Koutny
György Raffa
János Ziegler
Árpad Bánkuti
György Rozgonyi
Viktor Zsitva
Petér Bikár
Ferenc Lörincz
János Beszteri-Balogh
Karoly Orosz
Béla Schwalm
László Jakabházy
Gábor Boróczi
Head coach: György Pasztor

Ski jumping 

Athletes performed three jumps, the best two were counted and are shown here.

Speed skating

Men

Women

References
Official Olympic Reports
International Olympic Committee results database
 Olympic Winter Games 1964, full results by sports-reference.com

Nations at the 1964 Winter Olympics
1964
1964 in Hungarian sport